Lettie is a British London-based singer, songwriter, and multi-instrumentalist.

Biography
Lettie grew up in Suffolk, England.

She is a former Medieval History student and avid collector of postcards and ephemera.  She has, as a result of her love of films, been recording videos for most of her songs since 2008.  They often depict things that are fleeting and past such as the last day of Streatham Ice Arena on 17 December 2011, or an installation by Tomás Saraceno the Hayward Psycho Buildings exhibition (2008) or a day in her life.

Lettie met producer/writer David Baron in 2006 and has made three records with him, Age of Solo and Everyman (2008) and Good Fortune, Bad Weather (May 2012). The records were primarily recorded and produced at Baron's home studio in Boiceville, New York. All three records have been independently released.

In October 2009, Lettie performed a session at the BBC's Maida Vale Studios as part of 2009's Electric Proms. She performed "Atmosphere", "My Name Is", "Red" and "Hang On", with Mike Mason on Alesis Ion and guitar. During the same month, Lettie embarked on her first European tour, supporting ex-Bauhaus frontman Peter Murphy.  Lettie appears as a singer and co-writer on "Counting Waves" on Sarah Fimm's White Birds EP.

She has supported Squeeze’s Chris Difford and Roger O'Donnell and played the ‘Introducing Stages’ at Glastonbury and Jimmy’s Farm in 2010.

In between albums she has written with Anthony Phillips (Genesis) and sung vocals for Universal Music Group and her voice has appeared on a number of commercials in the US and Europe.

Lettie's new album produced and written with David Baron, Good Fortune, Bad Weather, makes use of Baron's collection of unusual instruments such as moogs, synths, and arps. The album features the musicianship of Danny Blume, Zachary Alford on drums and Sara Lee, D James Goodwin on guitars, Jeremy Bernstein, and David Baron on synthesizers and everything else.  The album garnered favourable many reviews across the board including four stars from the Irish Times.

Musical style
Lettie's music combines vintage analogue electronica and alternate-acoustic folk. Lettie's albums feature Arp and Moog modular synthesizer.

Lettie's live performances have taken her all over Europe as support act for Peter Murphy in 2009 and the UK in 2010.  She plays keyboards, electric guitar and harmonica.  She uses effects pedals, two microphones and a loop pedal to make the performance live and varied. Lettie presently plays with Richard Moore on electric violin.

Radio and television appearances
Lettie has been featured on BBC Radio 6 Music Introducing with Tom Robinson and has licensed tracks to H&M London, and various stateside television series, such as Privileged (the CW), Exes and Ohs (Logo) and Beyond the Break, which was shown on The N. Her song 'Everyman' was chosen for an advert for CTT Consigo "Zero Emissions" campaign, one of the first Carbon free shot commercial (the Portuguese postal service by Ameba) and her vocals appear on an advert for Mayflower's "Big Move" 2010 (Siblings Music) in USA which was nominated for an award at the Cannes Lions International Advertising Festival.

In 2009, Dermot O'Leary picked Lettie for the Electric Proms, and played her track "Hang On" on BBC Radio 2.

Lettie was one of the three featured artists in Rachel Davies' documentary Hello Glastonbury!, which first aired in the UK on BBC Four on 31 August 2010.

Her song "Lucky" was featured in the film Exit Strategy and Digital for ASOS Catwalk August 2012. Mister Lighter from her new album is being played in various retail outlets.

Several songs from the album have been played on RTÉ 10, Absolute Radio, BBC Suffolk, Amazing Radio and Radio 2.  Lettie released the single "Mister Lighter" in August 2012.

In 2014, she released a three track EP called Crossroads with Dave Barbarossa.

In October 2016, she appeared on a track from John Cooper Clarke, and Hugh Cornwell produced, album This Time It's Personal, on the song originally performed by John Leyton, "Johnny Remember Me".

Discography
Good Fortune, Bad Weather
Produced by David Baron
1. Swirl 3.07
2. Lucky 2.47 
3. Bitter 2.32
4. Never Want To Be Alone 3.28
5. Sanctuary 5.12
6. Digital 2.45
7. Pandora 2.50
8. Fitter 2.57
9. Mister Lighter 2.48
10. Aluminium Man 2.59
11. Good Fortune, Bad Weather 3.30
12. Come Back 3.21
13. Crash and Burn 2.40
14. On and On 2.52

Age of Solo
Produced by David Baron
1. Hero 4:20
2. My Name Is 3:51
3. Future Retro 3:40
4. Atmosphere 3:34
5. Eternity 3:31
6. Mission 3:31
7. Future 3:18
8. Cold 4:42
9. All You Want 3:41
10. Criminal 4:17
11. What You Get 2:44
12. Goodbye 4:04

Everyman
Produced by David Baron
1. Everyman 3:38
2. Shadow 3:06
3. Turnaround 3:00
4. Hang On 3:50
5. Red 3:12
6. High 3:54
7. Cheese 1:29
8. Holes 3:56
9. Believe In 4:15
10. Weird Old World 4:44
11. Nothing 2:28

References

External links
Lettie's Website
Irish Times May 2012
MSN Review May 2012
Notion 2012
Music Muso May 2012
Rhythm and Booze March 2012
Somojo Magazine May 2012
Popped Culture March 2012
Richard Adams Ramblings March 2012
BBC Introducing – Glastonbury 2010 – featured artists
BBC – Glastonbury 2010 – artists – Lettie
BBC Press Office – BBC Introducing – Glastonbury 2010 press release
 Electric Proms Featuring Lettie BBC
Entertainment Weekly Pop Watch Review of Lettie's "Age of Solo"
Weblog of Leonard's Lair Review of Lettie's "Age of Solo"
Wears the Trouser's Magazine Review of Lettie's "Age of Solo"
Chicken Ramen's Review of Lettie's "Age of Solo
Allmusic Guide Artists Pick Their Top 10 of 2008
Lettie's Myspace Site

Year of birth missing (living people)
Place of birth missing (living people)
Musicians from Suffolk
British folk singers
British folk guitarists
Electronica musicians
British songwriters
British multi-instrumentalists
British keyboardists